The 2016 United States Senate election in Utah took place on November 8, 2016, to elect a member of the United States Senate to represent the State of Utah, concurrently with the 2016 U.S. presidential election, as well as other elections to the United States Senate in other states and elections to the United States House of Representatives and various state and local elections.

The primaries took place on June 28. Misty Snow won the Democratic nomination, becoming the first transgender woman in the history of the United States to become a major party's nominee for the Senate.

Incumbent Republican Senator Mike Lee won re-election to a second term in office.

Republican primary 
It was thought that Lee, a Tea Party Republican, might face a primary challenge from a member of the more establishment wing of the Party following his role in the unpopular 2013 federal government shutdown, which caused his approval ratings to drop precipitously.  However, since that time, his approval ratings rose significantly.

Changes to Utah's primary system could adversely affect Lee's chances at renomination. Presently, Utah political parties hold conventions, where delegates attend and vote for candidates. Only if a candidate fails to gain at least 60% of the vote do the top two finishers proceed to a statewide primary election. In 2010, incumbent senator Bob Bennett finished third at the convention behind Lee and businessman Tim Bridgewater and was eliminated, with Lee defeating Bridgewater in the subsequent primary election. Lee's approval rating is much higher among the smaller group of more conservative convention delegates and a recent change in the law, backed by the group Count My Vote, allows candidates to bypass the convention by collecting signatures to advance to the primary. Thus, a less conservative challenger could challenge Lee in the primary, appealing to more moderate Republican and unaffiliated voters, who could participate in the primary. The constitutionality of the changes have been challenged in court by the Utah Republican Party.

One possible challenger to Lee was former governor of Utah and former United States Secretary of Health and Human Services Mike Leavitt, one of the founders of Count My Vote, though he eventually denied interest in running.  An effort to draft Huntsman Sr.'s son, Jon Huntsman Jr., the former governor of Utah, former United States Ambassador to China under Barack Obama and a candidate for President in 2012, was unsuccessful, with Huntsman ruling out a run against Lee.

Candidates

Declared 
 Mike Lee, incumbent senator

Declined 
 Lane Beattie, president and CEO of the Salt Lake Chamber of Commerce and former president of the Utah State Senate
 A. Scott Anderson, president and CEO of Zions Bank
 Jason Chaffetz, U.S. Representative
 Spencer Cox, Lieutenant Governor of Utah
 Alex Dunn, president of Vivint
 Jon Huntsman, Jr., former governor of Utah, former United States Ambassador to China under Barack Obama and candidate for President in 2012
 Kirk Jowers, director of the University of Utah Hinckley Institute of Politics
 Mike Leavitt, former governor of Utah and former United States Secretary of Health and Human Services
 Dan Liljenquist, former state senator and candidate for the U.S. Senate in 2012
 Aaron Osmond, state senator
 Sean Reyes, Attorney General of Utah
 Josh Romney, real estate developer and son of Mitt Romney
 Chris Stewart, U.S. Representative
 Thomas Wright, former chairman of the Utah Republican Party

Endorsements

Democratic primary

Candidates 
Jonathan Swinton was the first Democrat to announce his candidacy for U.S. Senate, filing on August 10. The other candidates filing for the nomination were Craig Oliver, Jade Tuan Quoc Vo, and Misty K. Snow. Snow filed on March 3. Oliver withdrew before the state convention. Vo was eliminated in the first round of balloting.

Swinton faced criticism at the April 23 state convention from delegates who said he was pro-life, a criticism based primarily on Swinton's September 26 op-ed in the Salt Lake Tribune in which he describes himself as a "conservative Democrat" and "pro-life" while also calling for "a full investigation of Planned Parenthood."  Swinton tried unsuccessfully to avoid discussing his views on abortion at the state convention.

After two rounds of balloting, neither Snow nor Swinton received the 60% of the vote they needed to secure the Democratic nomination.  As a result, the two faced off in a June 28 primary, which Snow won.

Declared 
 Misty K. Snow, cashier
 Jonathan Swinton, marriage and family therapist

Eliminated at Convention 
 Jade Tuan Quoc Vo

Withdrawn 
 Craig Oliver

Declined 
 Jim Matheson, former U.S. Representative
 Ben McAdams, Mayor of Salt Lake County and former state senator
 Doug Owens, attorney, son of former Congressman Wayne Owens, and nominee for Utah's 4th congressional district in 2014 (running for UT-04)

Polling 
A Dan Jones & Associates poll for UtahPolicy.com showed Snow leading with Democratic voters 33% to Swinton's 20%, as well as with independent voters, 23% to Swinton's 10%.  The majority of the voters that were surveyed were undecided.  The survey was administered from May 2–10, 2016 to 588 registered voters with a margin of error of +/- 4.04%.

Primary results

Third Party and Independent Candidates 
 Bill Barron (Independent), candidate for the U.S. Senate in 2012 and candidate for UT-02 in 2014
 Stoney Fonua (Independent American)

General election

Debates

Predictions

Polling

with Jonathan Swinton

with Jim Matheson

with Doug Owens

Open primary

Results

References

External links 
Official campaign websites
 Mike Lee (R) for Senate
 Misty Snow (D) for Senate

Utah
2016
United States Senate